Irwin M. Marcus (March 18, 1919 – October 3, 2021) was an American board certified psychiatrist, neurologist, psychoanalyst, medical educator, visual artist, and sculptor. He was a practicing psychiatrist, sex therapist, marriage counselor, psychoanalyst, child psychiatrist, and family counselor for over six decades.  Marcus started the Child Psychiatry Program at Tulane University School of Medicine in 1952, he was a Founder and President of the New Orleans Psychoanalytic Institute, Emeritus Professor of Clinical Psychiatry at LSU School of Medicine, and was considered a psychoanalytic scholar.

In June 2012, the American Academy of Child and Adolescent Psychiatry named Marcus a Distinguished and Life Member.  He was also a Distinguished Life Fellow of the American Psychiatric Association and a Fellow of the American College of Physicians.

Personal life
Marcus was married to Dorothy Elrod, sister of Chicago politician and judge Richard Elrod. He was then married to former journalist Angela Hill.

He turned 100 in March 2019, and died on October 3, 2021, at the age of 102.

Military service
Marcus was a World War II veteran. The day after the attack on Pearl Harbor, he enlisted in the United States Army as a neurologist and psychiatrist.

Publications
Marcus's writings are reflected in his authorship or co-authorship in hundreds of published medical articles, chapters and books on various aspects of sex therapy, marriage counseling, child psychiatry, family counseling, psychoanalysis and medical education, as well as ethical, socio-economic and philosophic discussions in these fields.

References

1919 births
2021 deaths
American centenarians
American child psychiatrists
American neurologists
American psychoanalysts
Jewish psychoanalysts
American Jews
Men centenarians
United States Army Medical Corps officers
University of Illinois alumni
Military personnel from Chicago
United States Army personnel of World War II
Military psychiatrists